Hyllisia is a genus of beetles in the family Cerambycidae, containing the following species:

subgenus Hyllisia

 Hyllisia abyssinica Téocchi, Jiroux & Sudre, 2004
 Hyllisia aethiopica Breuning, 1974
 Hyllisia albifrons Breuning, 1955
 Hyllisia albocincta (Pic, 1924)
 Hyllisia albolateralis Breuning, 1950
 Hyllisia albolineata Breuning, 1940
 Hyllisia albolineatipennis Breuning & Villiers, 1972
 Hyllisia albostictica Breuning, 1955
 Hyllisia angustata (Pic, 1926)
 Hyllisia antennata (Fabricius, 1801) 
 Hyllisia conradti Breuning, 1961
 Hyllisia consimilis Gahan, 1895
 Hyllisia damarensis Breuning, 1948
 Hyllisia delicatula Heller, 1924
 Hyllisia densepunctata Breuning, 1940
 Hyllisia flava Breuning, 1950
 Hyllisia flavicans Breuning, 1954
 Hyllisia flavomarmorata Breuning, 1940
 Hyllisia flavostictica Breuning, 1976
 Hyllisia flavovittata Breuning, 1961
 Hyllisia imitans Duvivier, 1892
 Hyllisia indica Breuning, 1947
 Hyllisia insetosa Breuning, 1955
 Hyllisia javanica Breuning, 1948
 Hyllisia kenyensis Breuning, 1948
 Hyllisia koui Breuning, 1962
 Hyllisia laterialba Breuning, 1981
 Hyllisia leucosuturata Hunt & Breuning, 1957
 Hyllisia lineata Gahan, 1894
 Hyllisia lineatopicta Breuning, 1954
 Hyllisia loloa Jordan, 1903
 Hyllisia minor Breuning, 1964
 Hyllisia multigriseovittata Báguena & Breuning, 1958
 Hyllisia multilineata Breuning, 1940
 Hyllisia niveovittata Aurivillius, 1910
 Hyllisia obliquepicta Breuning, 1940
 Hyllisia occidentalis Breuning, 1964
 Hyllisia ochreovittata Breuning, 1940
 Hyllisia ochreovittipennis Breuning, 1977
 Hyllisia oshimana Breuning, 1955
 Hyllisia persimilis Breuning, 1940
 Hyllisia picta Breuning, 1940
 Hyllisia pseudolineata Breuning, 1942
 Hyllisia quadricollis Fairmaire, 1871
 Hyllisia quadriflavicollis Breuning, 1957
 Hyllisia quinquelineata Breuning, 1948
 Hyllisia ruficolor (Pic, 1934)
 Hyllisia rufipes (Pic, 1934)
 Hyllisia saigonensis (Pic, 1933)
 Hyllisia shembaganurensis Breuning, 1982
 Hyllisia somaliensis Breuning, 1972
 Hyllisia stenideoides Pascoe, 1864
 Hyllisia strandi Breuning, 1940
 Hyllisia subvariegata Breuning, 1953
 Hyllisia subvittipennis Breuning & Ohbayashi, 1966
 Hyllisia sumatrana Breuning, 1940
 Hyllisia suturalis Aurivillius, 1920
 Hyllisia suturaloides Breuning, 1981
 Hyllisia taihokensis (Matsushita, 1933)
 Hyllisia tonkinea (Fairmaire, 1888)
 Hyllisia tonkinensis Breuning, 1948
 Hyllisia triguttata Aurivillius, 1914
 Hyllisia trivittata Breuning, 1940
 Hyllisia truncata Breuning, 1956
 Hyllisia unicoloricornis Breuning, 1954
 Hyllisia uniformis Breuning, 1972
 Hyllisia variegata Aurivillius, 1907
 Hyllisia vicina Breuning, 1982
 Hyllisia virgata Gerstaecker, 1871
 Hyllisia vittipennis Breuning, 1940

subgenus Madecassohyllisia
 Hyllisia madecassa Breuning, 1948

References

 
Agapanthiini